Matheus Aurélio Palhares Guimarães (born 23 June 1999), known as Matheus Aurélio is a Brazilian footballer who plays for Hercílio Luz as a goalkeeper.

Career statistics

Honours
Náutico
 Campeonato Brasileiro Série C: 2019

Mirassol
 Campeonato Brasileiro Série D: 2020

References

External links

1999 births
Living people
People from São José do Rio Preto
Brazilian footballers
Association football goalkeepers
Campeonato Brasileiro Série C players
Campeonato Brasileiro Série D players
Mirassol Futebol Clube players
Clube Náutico Capibaribe players
Hercílio Luz Futebol Clube players
Footballers from São Paulo (state)